Soyuz TMA-10 was a human spaceflight mission using a Soyuz-TMA spacecraft to transport personnel to and from the International Space Station (ISS). The mission began at 17:31:09 UTC on April 7, 2007 when the spacecraft was launched  from the Baikonur Cosmodrome by a Soyuz FG launch vehicle. Soyuz TMA-10 brought to the station two members of ISS Expedition 15 crew, along with one spaceflight participant. It remained at the space station as an escape craft until it was replaced by Soyuz TMA-11 in October 2007.

Crew

Backup crew

Docking with ISS
Docked to ISS: 9 April 2007, 19:10 UTC (to nadir port of Zarya)
Undocking from ISS: 27 September 2007 20:20 UTC (from nadir port of Zarya)
Docking to ISS: 27 September 2007 20:47 UTC (to aft port of Zvezda)
Undocking from ISS: 21 October 2007 07:14 UTC (from aft port of Zvezda)

Mission highlights 
Soyuz TMA-10 docked to the ISS on April 9, 2007 at 22:10 UTC, following two days of free flight. Its two Russian crew members remained on the station until the spacecraft's return to Earth in October 2007. Spaceflight participant Charles Simonyi returned to Earth aboard Soyuz TMA-9 on April 21, following eleven days of ISS handover operations.

TMA-10 undocked from the ISS at 07:14 UTC on October 21, and deorbit occurred at 09:47. The trajectory was reported by the crew as soon as they came out of the communications blackout caused by plasma surrounding the spacecraft. (A ballistic trajectory is a backup re-entry mode that takes over if something fails during normal re-entry.) A Commission of Inquiry determined that the ballistic re-entry was caused by damage to a cable in the spacecraft's control panel, which connected to the control panel with the Soyuz descent equipment. Landing occurred at 10:36 GMT. A ballistic trajectory entry had happened previously, with the Soyuz TMA-1 mission that returned Expedition 6. The information about the failure of a connector in service panel was faulty. In actuality, the Service module (PAO) had failed to separate from the re-entry module (SA), and the ship had entered the atmosphere with the opposite orientation. Explosive bolts in connection struts between the Re-entry module and the Service module had failed to explode. The heat had melted the failed struts and the re-entry module had separated from the service module - the changed trajectory of the ship had caused the switch to a ballistic emergency landing. The same situation had happened during the Soyuz 5 mission in 1969. The Soyuz re-entry module was, and still is, protected on all sides with thermal insulation, so the struts melted before the crew entry hatch was damaged or destroyed, thus saving the crew. The Russians kept the failure of the Soyuz TMA-10 a secret until it happened again on the Soyuz TMA-11 with a NASA astronaut on board. This infuriated NASA (the Commission of Inquiry had lied to them) and this led to further investigation as well as special EVA activity on the ISS to check the docked Soyuz TMA-12 and its explosive bolts in their connection struts.

References

External links 

 Charles in Space 
Soyuz TMA-10

Crewed Soyuz missions
Spacecraft launched in 2007
Orbital space tourism missions
Spacecraft which reentered in 2007
Spacecraft launched by Soyuz-FG rockets